Pieter van den Bosch is the name of:

Pieter van den Bosch (footballer) (1927–2009), Belgian footballer
Pieter van den Bosch (painter) (1612 – 1673), Dutch artist